North Kawartha is a township in northern Peterborough County, Ontario, Canada.

North Kawartha was formed in 1998 through an amalgamation of the Townships of Burleigh and Anstruther and the Township of Chandos. For a while after this merger, it was known as Burleigh-Anstruther-Chandos.

Communities

Within the township are smaller urbanized areas such as the village of Apsley, and the hamlets of Big Cedar, Burleigh Falls, Glen Alda, Mount Julian, Stoneyridge and Woodview. These communities are surrounded by freshwater lakes including Chandos, Jack, Anstruther, Eels, and many more.

Etymology
 Anstruther was likely named for Sir Windham Carmichael-Anstruther, 8th Baronet.
 Apsley was probably named for Apsley House, London residence of the Dukes of Wellington.
 Burleigh was likely named for Burleigh Hall in Leicestershire.
 Chandos was named in 1862 for Richard Temple-Nugent-Brydges-Chandos-Grenville, 3rd Duke of Buckingham and Chandos
 Kawartha comes from an aboriginal word Ka-wa-tha, meaning "land of reflections". For more on this etymology, see Kawartha Lakes.

Government
The local government is the Corporation of the Township of North Kawartha. The current mayor is Carolyn Amyotte.

Schools 
Apsley Central Public School, is the only school located in Apsley and provides education from kindergarten to grade 8. The school is under the jurisdiction of the Kawartha Pine Ridge District School Board. Secondary education requires travel outside to Peterborough.

Recreation 
North Kawartha is home to the North Kawartha Knights, a junior hockey team playing in the Jr. C Central League of the Ontario Hockey Association. They started play in 2014. The home arena for the Knights is the North Kawartha Community Centre located in Apsley.

North Kawartha also has several golf courses, including Marvel Rapids golf course and Owenbrook golf course.

Demographics 

See also
 List of townships in Ontario
 Kawartha Lakes (Ontario), a chain of lakes
 Kawartha Lakes, a city

References

External links

Lower-tier municipalities in Ontario
Municipalities in Peterborough County
Township municipalities in Ontario